Du weinst um ihn is a German ballad by singer Thomas Anders. It was his second single.

Track listing
CBS S 9482 7"
 "Du Weinst Um Ihn" (Daniel David/Norbert Hammerschmidt) - 3:57
 "Einer Von Uns Beiden" (Anders Glenmark/Bo Maniette/Norbert Hammerschmidt) - 4:56

References

1980 singles
Thomas Anders songs
1980s ballads
CBS Records singles
1980 songs